Ryszard Pawłowski (24 June 1950 in Bogatynia) - Polish alpine and high-altitude climber and photographer. Member of The Explorers Club.

Ryszard Pawlowski is the founder and co-owner of the Patagonia Mountain Agency. He has been climbing since 1970 and is an alpinism instructor and guide. He has climbed the mountains of North and South America, the Himalayas, Alps, Caucasus, Pamirs and Tian Shan.

He has summitted Mount Everest five times - 13 May 1994, 12 May 1995, 18 May 1999, 20 May 2012 and 25 May 2014. 

He has climbed with - Jerzy Kukuczka, Piotr Pustelnik, Janusz Majer, Krzysztof Wielicki.

He has summited ten of the fourteen 8000 metre peaks including K2.

Eight–thousanders
 14 July 1984 – Broad Peak (classic route)
 22 October 1991 – Annapurna (Bonington route)
 24 August 1993 – Nanga Parbat (Kinshofer route)
 13 May 1994 – Mount Everest (classic route)
 11 October 1994 – Lhotse (classic route)
 12 May 1995 – Mount Everest (northern route)
 14 August 1996 – K2 (north pillar)
 15 July 1997 – Gasherbrum I (classic route)
 20 July 1997 – Gasherbrum II (classic route)
 18 May 1999 – Mount Everest (northern route)
 4 October 2000 – Cho Oyu
 1 October 2001 – Shisha Pangma Middle
 26 July 2003 – Gasherbrum II
 3 May 2005 – Cho Oyu
 23 July 2006 – Gasherbrum II
 20 May 2012 – Mount Everest
 25 May 2014 – Mount Everest
 27 September 2017 – Manaslu

Other ascents
 1977 – Kohe Tez, Kohe Shan
 1981 – Ismail Samani Peak
 1982 – Lantang Lirung
 1983 – Pumori
 1987 – Ushba
 1988 – Fitz Roy
 1992 – Ama Dablam
 1997 – Torres del Paine

As a mountain guide:
 Ama Dablam – 20 times,
 Aconcagua – 30 times,
 Mount McKinley – 9 times,
 Island Peak – 7 times,
 Pumori – 2 times.

See also
List of Mount Everest summiters by number of times to the summit

External links
 Article about Makalu expedition
 Ryszard Pawłowski the famous Polish climber. /Version english and polish/

1950 births
Polish mountain climbers
Living people
Polish summiters of Mount Everest
People from Bogatynia